Arthur Onslow (1691–1768) was Speaker of the British House of Commons.

Arthur Onslow may also refer to:

Sir Arthur Onslow, 1st Baronet (1622–1688), English politician
Arthur Onslow, 3rd Earl of Onslow (1777–1870), British peer
Arthur Onslow (priest) (1746–1817), Dean of Worcester, 1795–1817
Arthur Onslow (Australian politician) (1833–1882), New South Wales politician